Sverd i fjell is a commemorative monument located in the Hafrsfjord neighborhood of Madla, a borough of the city of Stavanger which lies in the southwestern part of the large municipality of Stavanger in Rogaland county, Norway.

History
The monument was created by sculptor Fritz Røed from Bryne and was unveiled by King Olav V of Norway in 1983. They commemorate the historic Battle of Hafrsfjord which took place there in the year 872, when King Harald Fairhair gathered all of Norway under one crown. The largest sword represents the victorious Harald, and the two smaller swords represent the defeated petty kings. The monument also represents peace, since the swords are planted into solid rock, so they may never be removed.

See also
Møllebukta
Ytraberget

References

External links
Swords in Rock

Jæren
Monuments and memorials in Norway
Outdoor sculptures in Norway
Buildings and structures in Stavanger
Tourist attractions in Rogaland
1983 establishments in Norway
Harald Fairhair